Five Fingers is a settlement in New Brunswick.

History

Notable people

See also
List of communities in New Brunswick

References

Communities in Restigouche County, New Brunswick